The Alder Street food cart pod was a pod of food carts at the intersection of Southwest 10th Avenue and Alder Street in Portland, Oregon.

Description and history
Established during the 1990s, the popular pod hosted approximately 60 carts at its peak. According to The Columbian, "The Alder Street food cart pod in downtown Portland over the years grew into a central piece of the region's culture." In 2008, the pod appeared on the thirteenth season of The Amazing Race.

The pod was the city's largest, before closing in 2019 for construction of Block 216. In late 2019, Eater Portland Brooke Jackson-Glidden wrote, "Earlier this year, the loss of one of Portland’s most notable food cart pods struck fear into the hearts of many local diners: The closure of the Alder Street food carts was seen as the potential death rattle of the city’s larger street food scene." Some of the carts relocated to Ankeny Square, a section of the North Park Blocks south of Burnside Street. The food pod Cart Blocks opened in Ankeny Square in 2021.

Bing Mi and Shanghai's Best operated food carts at the site.

See also

 Food carts in Portland, Oregon

References

External links

1990s establishments in Oregon
2019 disestablishments in Oregon
Food carts in Portland, Oregon
Southwest Portland, Oregon